These are the squads for the countries that played in the 1945 South American Championship. The participating countries were Argentina, Bolivia, Brazil, Chile, Colombia (for the first time), Ecuador, and Uruguay. Paraguay and Peru withdrew from the tournament. The teams plays in a single round-robin tournament, earning two points for a win, one point for a draw, and zero points for a loss. Colombia was represented by the club Junior.

Argentina
Head Coach: Guillermo Stábile

Bolivia
Head Coach:

Brazil
Head coach:  Flávio Costa

Chile
Head Coach:  Franz Platko

Colombia
Head Coach:  Roberto Meléndez (also participated as footballer)

Ecuador
Head Coach:  Rodolfo Orlandini

Uruguay
Head Coach:  José Nasazzi

References

1945 South American Championship
Copa América squads